Neobartsia pumila, formerly Bartsia pumila, is a species of flowering plants in the family Orobanchaceae. It is endemic to Ecuador.

References

pumila
Endemic flora of Ecuador
Vulnerable plants
Taxonomy articles created by Polbot
Taxobox binomials not recognized by IUCN